The 2008 Top League Challenge Series was the 2008 edition of the Top League Challenge Series, a second-tier rugby union competition in Japan, in which teams from regionalised leagues competed for promotion to the Top League for the 2008–09 season. The competition was contested from 27 January to 10 February 2008.

Kintetsu Liners and Yokogawa Musashino Atlastars won promotion to the 2008–09 Top League, while Mazda Blue Zoomers and World Fighting Bull progressed to the promotion play-offs.

Competition rules and information

The top two teams from the regional Top East League, Top West League and Top Kyūshū League qualified to the Top League Challenge Series. The regional league winners participated in Challenge 1, while the runners-up participated in Challenge 2.

The top two teams in Challenge 1 won automatic promotion to the 2008–09 Top League, while the third-placed team in Challenge 1 and the Challenge 2 winner qualified to the promotion play-offs.

Qualification

The teams qualified to the Challenge 1 and Challenge 2 series through the 2007 regional leagues.

Top West League

The final standings for the 2007 Top West League were:

 Honda Heat, Kintetsu Liners and World Fighting Bull qualified to the Second Phase.

 Kintetsu Liners qualified for Challenge 1.
 World Fighting Bull qualified for Challenge 2.

Top East League

The final standings for the 2007 Top East League were:

 Yokogawa Musashino Atlastars qualified for Challenge 1.
 Secom Rugguts qualified for Challenge 2 after a play-off match against NTT Communications Shining Arcs.

The following match was played:

 Insurance Meiji Life Yasuda and Shimizu Blue Sharks were relegated to lower leagues.

Top Kyūshū League

The final standings for the 2007 Top Kyūshū League were:

 Chugoku Electric Power, Mazda Blue Zoomers and Mitsubishi Heavy Industries qualified to the Second Phase.
 Mitsubishi Mizushima were relegated to lower leagues.

 Mazda Blue Zoomers qualified for Challenge 1.
 Chugoku Electric Power qualified for Challenge 2.

Challenge 1

Standings

The final standings for the 2008 Top League Challenge 1 were:

 Kintetsu Liners and Yokogawa Musashino Atlastars won promotion to the 2008–09 Top League.
 Mazda Blue Zoomers progressed to the promotion play-offs.

Matches

The following matches were played in the 2008 Top League Challenge 1:

Challenge 2

Standings

The final standings for the 2008 Top League Challenge 2 were:

 World Fighting Bull progressed to the promotion play-offs.

Matches

The following matches were played in the 2008 Top League Challenge 2:

See also

 2007–08 Top League
 Top League Challenge Series

References

2008 Challenge
2007–08 in Japanese rugby union
2008 rugby union tournaments for clubs